The McCraw Cemetery is a historic cemetery in Jacksonville, Arkansas.  It is located in a wooded area on the city's southeastern outskirts, well south of the Military Road (Arkansas Highway 264), and west of the Military Mobile Homes.  It has 37 marked graves, of which ten are of children.  The markers date from 1841 to 1937, and include some of the first settlers of northern Pulaski County.  The cemetery, a family plot of the McCraw family, was lost for many years, and is now under the care of the Reed's Bridge Historical Society.

The cemetery was listed on the National Register of Historic Places in 2006.

See also

 National Register of Historic Places listings in Pulaski County, Arkansas

References

External links
 

Buildings and structures completed in 1841
Buildings and structures in Pulaski County, Arkansas
Cemeteries in Pulaski County, Arkansas
Cemeteries on the National Register of Historic Places in Arkansas
Jacksonville, Arkansas
National Register of Historic Places in Pulaski County, Arkansas
Cemeteries established in the 1840s